The Nyong (formerly ) is a river in Cameroon.

Course 
The river's length is almost parallel to the lower reaches of the Sanaga River. In two places, Mbalmayo and Déhané, the river has huge rapids. The first  of the river, between Abong-Mbang and Mbalmayo, are navigable for small boats from April to November.

Hydrology 
The flow of the river as measured at Déhané in m³/s:

Transport
The town of Mbalmayo, which has a railhead, lies on the north bank of this river. The towns of Akonolinga and Abong-Mbang also lie on it.

References

Rivers of Cameroon